Cripps Corner is a village in the civil parish of Ewhurst and the  Rother district of East Sussex, England. It is in the High Weald Area of Outstanding Natural Beauty, and on a southern ridge of the valley of the River Rother which flows through Bodiam,  to the north of Cripps Corner.

Cripps Corner is one of three settlements in Ewhurst parish, the others being Staplecross and Ewhurst Green to the north. The village is centred on the convergence of three roads forming an open triangle. These roads are the B2165 which runs from Cripps Corner to Beckley at the north-east; the B2089 from the A21 road at the west to Rye at the east; and the B2244 from The Moor (village) in Hawkhurst at the north to Sedlescombe at the south, which within the settlement is named Junction Road. A viaduct carries the B2089 over the B2244. It was built in 1834 by Stephen Putnam of St Leonards-on-Sea who was responsible for the improvement of the East Sussex section of the road between the Medway towns and Hastings. Putnam followed the designs of Thomas Telford who had, a short while beforehand, been responsible for road-over-road bridges in Kent.

The closest school is Staplecross Methodist Primary School to the north in Staplecross. To the north-east, adjacent to the village on the B2165 to Staplecross, is a garden centre and a plant nursery. To the north on the B2244 is a Glamping site. To the west on the B2089 is a pet supplies company; and, at Swaile's Green, a furniture maker & seller. Adjacent at the south, on the B2244 in Sedlescombe, is an organic vineyard and a small light industrial site. Opposite the vineyard is the site venue for the annual 'Big Green Cardigan', a multi-genre music event for approximately 500 people.

Cripps Corner is connected by bus to Hastings, Bodiam, and Hawkhurst (349); Etchingham, Sedlescombe, and Bexhill-on-Sea (360); Westfield, Northiam, Staplecross, and Robertsbridge (381); Westfield, and Robertsbridge (382); Peasmarsh, Sedlescombe, and Robertsbridge (383); and Mountfield, Broad Oak, and Battle (B72).

Landmarks

This line of traps stretch through fields from Cripps Corner to Poppinghole Lane, a road which runs north from the adjacent hamlet of Swaile's Green. The traps surrounding Cripps Corner were augmented with pillboxes, and provided a defence in vulnerable sectors not protected by the "heavily-wooded" surroundings of the village. In the summer and autumn of 1940 Cripps Corner was considered an enclosed 'fortress', or 'nodal point' in a line of defence using natural or man-made barriers which extended southwestward from the village, and southeastward to the sea at the north-east of Hastings. The Archaeology Data Service states that the  Cripps Corner defences "represents  the  finest  surviving  example  in  the  country  of  the  concrete  anti-tank perimeter defences".

Within Cripps Corner, defined by East Sussex County Council's village entry road signs, are three Grade II listed buildings. 'Forge House', on the B2165 and opposite the garage, and The White Hart pub, which is a two-storey red brick house of two bays, with a gabled porch, dating to the early 19th century. The 18th-century front part, which sits on a brick plinth, is of timber framing overlaid with white-painted weatherboarding, with a central gabled porch. The 19th-century rear of the building is constructed of two brick and stone gables, the walls of the upper parts with overlapping red tile facings.

At  outside the village at the side of the B2165 is the Grade II 18th-century 'Beaconsfield House', of two storeys with a half-hipped roof, the ground floor of white-painted brick, the upper with overlapping red tile facing.

References

External links
 
 Ewhurst Parish Council, web site. Retrieved 4 February 2019
 Big Green Cardigan music festival. Retrieved 4 February 2019

Villages in East Sussex
Rother District